Jaylien Arthur-Henry Cantrell (born September 23, 1999), known professionally as YN Jay, is an American rapper. After releasing his debut mixtape MVP in 2019, his song "Coochie" went viral on social media in 2020. His first two studio albums, Ninja Warrior and Coochie Chronicles, were released in 2021 through Alamo Records.

Early life
Jay was raised in Beecher, Michigan, and had one older brother, Gabe, who inspired Jay to start rapping at age 10. As a teenager, he recorded eight to 10 songs a day, and started rapping as a career after his brother died.

Career
In November 2019, he released his debut mixtape MVP. He released the single "Coochie" with Louie Ray in April 2020, which went viral on YouTube and other social media platforms. He released the single "Gotta Get Rich" in July 2020. His mixtapes Coochie Land and Watch This were released in 2020, in August and September, respectively. His single "Blind 'Em" with Lil Yachty was released in September 2020, and his single "Doonie Van" was released in October 2020.

Jay released his debut studio album, Ninja Warrior, in January 2021 through Alamo Records. He released the single "Big Hoes" featuring Lil Pump in March 2021, and was featured on Lil Yachty's song "Flintana" from his mixtape Michigan Boy Boat in April 2021. His song "Triple S" went viral on TikTok, and a remix of the song featuring Coi Leray was released in June 2021. Jay was featured on Mace Supreme's song "Jumanji" that same month. His second studio album, Coochie Chronicles, was released in July 2021. He released the single "Lamar" in November 2021.

Artistry
Jay's music has been described as hip hop and trap. Alphonse Pierre of Pitchfork wrote, "YN Jay endlessly recycles his own lyrics and big brr somehow keeps coming up with something new." Neena Rouhani of Billboard called Jay a "Detroit favorite", while Entertainment Weeklys Eli Enis called Jay one of "the most prolific voices from Michigan's fertile rap scene". In 2021, XXL included the music video for "Coochie" on their list of the funniest hip-hop music videos of the prior five years. Jay refers to himself as the "Coochie Man".

Discography

Studio albums

Mixtapes

Singles

As lead artist

As featured artist

References

21st-century American rappers
African-American male rappers
Living people
Rappers from Michigan
Sony Music artists
Trap musicians
Year of birth missing (living people)
1999 births